Grębocin  is a village in the administrative district of Gmina Nowe Brzesko, within Proszowice County, Lesser Poland Voivodeship, in southern Poland.

The village has a population of 500.

References

Villages in Proszowice County